Sean Pollard (born March 22, 1991) is an Australian Paralympian who represented Australia in para-snowboarding at the 2018 Winter Paralympics in PyeongChang, Korea.

Personal
On 2 October 2014, Pollard was attacked by two sharks (possibly great whites) whilst surfing at Kelpids Beach, east of Esperance, Western Australia. He lost his left arm and right hand whilst fighting off the sharks. Before the attack he was an electrician, keen surfer and former South Bunbury footballer. In March 2015, more than $100,000 was raised by his local community in Bunbury, Western Australia to assist him on his new journey.

Career
It was not until 2015 that Pollard encountered snow for the first time during a holiday in Canada. During the holiday, he tried snowboarding. After returning to Australia, he took part in an Australian Paralympic Committee specialist camp for Para-snowboarders with upper limb impairments. Pollard has mentioned that his previous surfing and skating skils have helped his transition into snowboarding.

In his first international season, he had several top 15 results including a sixth-place finish in the men's Snowboard Cross at the 2017 IPC Snowboard World Cup at Lake Tahoe, United States. At the 2016/17 IPC World Cup Finals in PyeongChang, South Korea, Pollard finished eight in the snow board cross and banked slalom.

At the 2018 Winter Paralympics, he competed in two snowboard events - fifth in the Men's Banked Slalom SB-UL and ninth in the Men's Snowboard Cross SB-UL.

At the 2019 World Para Snowboard Championships, Pyha, Finland, Pollard won the bronze medal in Men's Snowboard Cross UL and finished seventh in the Men's Banked Slalom UL.

Pollard did not compete at the 2022 Winter Paralympics as he decided to remain with his young family in Western Australia due to the States strict COVID travel restrictions.

References

External links
 Australian Paralympic Committee Profile

1991 births
Living people
Australian male snowboarders
Snowboarders at the 2018 Winter Paralympics
Shark attack victims